J type or Type J may refer to:

J-type asteroid
MG J-type, a sports car
Morris Commercial J-type, a van
Renault J-Type engine
Caudron Type J, an airplane
Type J thermocouple, an electrical device

See also
J class (disambiguation)
Type J1 submarine